John Levantis (May 26, 1925 – August 14, 2010) was a Canadian professional football player who played for the Toronto Argonauts. He won the Grey Cup with them in 1946 and 1947. He was later a firefighter. His brother Steve Levantis also played professional football.

Levantis was born in Montreal, Quebec and moved to Toronto at an early age. After graduating, Levantis became a firefighter. In those days, professional players did not earn much for playing football and a full-time job was essential. According to John, you were happy to get a windbreaker at the end of the season. Levantis died in 2010.

References

1925 births
2010 deaths
Anglophone Quebec people
Canadian football ends
Players of Canadian football from Quebec
Canadian football people from Montreal
Toronto Argonauts players